Crystal Mountains National Park is a twin park and one of the 13 national parks of Gabon. It is situated in the Monts de Crystal on the western edge of the Woleu-Ntem Plateau, between Equatorial Guinea and the Ogooué River. The twin parks, Mbe National Park  and Mt Sene National Park, were established on 4 September 2002, based on their exceptionally high plant biodiversity and forming part of a former Pleistocene rain forest refugium.

The park is home to many animal species such as elephants or monkeys, and hundreds of species of butterflies can be found here, some of which are very rare, such as euphaedra brevis, cymothoe or graphium angrier.

External links 
 Wildlife Conservation Society
Virtual Tour of the National Parks

References

National parks of Gabon
Protected areas established in 2002
2002 establishments in Gabon